Paramotor is the generic name for the harness and propulsive portion of a powered paraglider ("PPG"). There are two basic types of paramotors: foot launch and wheel launch.

Foot launch models consist of a frame with harness, fuel tank, engine, and propeller. A hoop with protective netting primarily keeps lines out of the propeller. The unit is worn like a large backpack to which a Paraglider is attached through carabiners.

Wheel launch units either come as complete units with their own motor and propeller, or as an add-on to a foot-launch paramotor. They usually have 3 (trike) or 4 (quad) wheels, with seats for one or two occupants. These are distinct from powered parachutes which are generally much heavier, more powerful, and have different steering.

The term was first used by Englishman Mike Byrne in 1980 and popularized in France around 1986 when La Mouette began adapting power to the then-new paraglider wings.

Power plants are almost exclusively small two-stroke internal combustion engines, between 80 cc and 350 cc, that burn a mixture of gasoline and oil. These engines are favored for their high thrust-to-weight ratio of engine plus fuel; they use approximately 3.7 litres (1 US Gal.) of fuel per hour depending on paraglider efficiency, the weight of unit plus pilot, and weather conditions. At least one manufacturer produces a 4-stroke model with better fuel efficiency, which produces strong thrust at lower rotational speeds (RPM). Electrically powered units are also made, though flight duration is limited by battery weight. Csaba Lemak built the first electric PPG, flying it first on 13 June 2006. Wankel rotary engined paramotors are also available, but rare.

The pilot controls thrust via a hand-held throttle and steers using the wing's brake toggles, stabilo steering, weight shifting or a combination of the three. Unlike unpowered paragliding, launching from an elevation or catching thermal columns to ascend are not required. Paramotor wings somewhat different from free flight "paraglider" wings have evolved; such wings are typically designed for a higher speed and may incorporate a "reflex" profile to aid stability in pitch, an idea taken from hang gliders of the 1980s, and developed and pioneered by British designer Mike Campbell-Jones. Paramotor wings typically use trimmers to adjust the angle of attack of the wing to decrease or increase speed. Trimmed out allows the pilot to achieve maximum speed, while trimmed in allows slower speeds, required for launching and landing. Trimmers usually act on the rear of the wing. The angle of attack can also be adjusted by a pulley-style system activated by a bar pushed by the pilot's feet, called a speedbar. This system generally acts on the leading edge of the wing; it is only activated in-flight, and is not usually activated on takeoff or landing. Due to the torque effect of the motor, this can cause the glider to turn, especially under hard acceleration. Trimmers can be adjusted unequally to counter this effect.

The most difficult aspect of paramotoring is controlling the wing (paraglider) on the ground during launch and upon landing. Initial training in becoming a paramotor pilot involves managing the wing in the air from the ground without the motor. This process, called kiting, is the most complicated and important step in the process. Once kiting the wing on the ground is mastered, the motor is added to the process to practice with the weight of the paramotor included. A typical paramotor weighs on average around 50 lb (23 kg) with some models as light at 40 lb (18 kg) and some models as heavy as 75 lb (34 kg). The size of the paramotor wing and engine required depend on the weight of the pilot: the heavier the pilot, the larger the size of the wing and thrust required to launch. Most people in reasonably good health can foot-launch a paramotor; some pilots with artificial joints foot-launch. People with issues with the physical aspect of foot launching may opt to add a trike or quad to their paramotor, a platform to which the paramotor can be attached so it can be launched rolling on wheels.

Paramotoring has evolved, and as of the 2020s many advanced pilots perform extreme maneuvers such as wing-overs, barrel rolls and loops. These types of maneuvers present a significant danger, as if the wing is subjected to negative G it will unload, allowing its lines to go slack, losing lift. These maneuvers are typically practised only by very advanced pilots, who wear a reserve parachute to use in case of loss of control.

References 

Paragliding
Air sports
Aircraft engines
Paramotors